The 1966 Úrvalsdeild karla was the 15th season of the top tier men's basketball league on Iceland, then known as 1. deild karla. KR won their 2nd title by posting the best record in the league. ÍKF got relegated after posting the worst record in the league.

Einar Bollason led the league in total scoring with 210 points.

Competition format
The participating teams played each other twice for a total of 10 games. The top team won the national championship. If two teams were tied at the top at the end of the season, they would have to play an extra game to decide the national championship.

Regular season

Scoring leaders

Source: Íþróttablaðið

References

External links
Official Icelandic Basketball Federation website

Úrvalsdeild karla (basketball)